Bohuslav Hasištejnský z Lobkovic (1461 – 11 November 1510) was a Czech nobleman, writer and humanist of  the old Bohemian family (later the princes) of Lobkovic.

He was born at Hasištejn Castle near Kadaň, Bohemia. He studied in Bologna and Ferrara (doctor of law, 1482) and converted from Utraquism to Catholicism there. After 1483, he became provost of Vyšehrad in Prague and between 1490–91 he travelled to the Holy Land and Egypt, earning the nickname "the Czech Ulysses". He was elected the bishop of Olomouc, but he was refused by the Pope. After this, he lived with a few of his writer friends in his 'tusculum', Hasištejn Castle in north-eastern Bohemia.

Lobkovic was an author of philosophical prose, letters, and verses, amongst them a satire on Bohemian national life: Ad sanctum Venceslaum satira (1489). He was a successful essayist and poet, and became poeta laureatus.

His good friends were Jan Šlechta z Všehrd, a philosopher, Viktorin Kornel ze Všehrd and Racek Doubravský z Doubravy, both theorist of Bohemian common law. He was the younger brother of Jan Hasištejnský z Lobkovic.

He died at Hasištejn Castle in 1510.

External links 
James Naughton: CZECH RENAISSANCE LITERATURE AND HUMANISM
Lobkowitz Library

Sources 
 KYZOUROVÁ, Ivana. Básník a král: Bohuslav Hasištejnský z Lobkovic v zrcadle jagellonské doby. Praha: Správa pražského hradu, 2007, 127p.
 MARTÍNEK,Jan, MARTÍNKOVÁ, Dana. ed.Epistulae Bohuslaus Hassinsteinius a Lobkowicz. Leipzig: B.G.Teubner, 1980.

1461 births
1510 deaths
People from Kadaň
Lobkowicz family
Czech poets
Czech male poets
15th-century Latin writers